Relations between Albania and Serbia have been complex and largely unfriendly due to a number of historical and political events. 

Albania has an embassy in Belgrade. Serbia has an embassy in Tirana. Both countries are full members of the Council of Europe, the Organization for Security and Co-operation in Europe (OSCE), the Central European Free Trade Agreement (CEFTA) and the Organization of the Black Sea Economic Cooperation (BSEC).

History

Ottoman period 
In the late Ottoman period, Serbian diplomat Ilija Garašanin contacted the abbot of Mirdita, Monsignor Gasper Krasniqi, with the goal of acquiring the Albanian Catholic element as the alleged solution to the "Eastern Question". However, their goals were different. While Garašanin considered those contacts as means for the realization of a Serbian exit to the Adriatic Sea, Krasniqi made effort to help Serbia to organize a revolution of the Albanian Catholic community, primarily Mirdita, against the Turks, for the political freedom and independence of Albania.

Balkan Wars 

At the beginning of Balkan Wars, one of the important strategic goals of Serbian politics was to acquire a corridor to the Adriatic Sea, as such, its intention had been to share a common border with its ally the Kingdom of Greece thus denying the Albanian state independent status. At the First Balkan War, Albanians fought for a national state. This fighting was largely limited, however, to militia operations and guerrilla tactics.

World War II 

During World War II, very close cooperation developed between the People's Liberation Army of Yugoslavia and the People's Liberation Army of Albania. The Albanian People's Army assumed power in the country in 1944. Democratic Federal Yugoslavia was the first country to recognize the new government of Albania in April 1945.

Cold War 

There were communist plans to create a Balkan federation which would include Yugoslavia, Albania, Romania, Bulgaria and Greece. However, after the resolution of Informbiro 1948, Albania broke relations with the Yugoslav communists, because Enver Hoxha remained loyal to the Soviet Union under Joseph Stalin.

Yugoslav Wars 
After NATO's bombing campaign in Kosovo, Albania supported them which resulted in FR Yugoslavia breaking diplomatic relations with Albania.

21st century 

Albanian Prime Minister Edi Rama visited Serbia and met with Serbian Prime Minister Aleksandar Vučić on 10 November 2014 for the first meeting of its type between the two countries' leadership since the 1947 meeting of Albanian dictator Enver Hoxha with President of Yugoslavia Josip Broz Tito. However, tempers flared when Rama said that Kosovo's independence was "undeniable" and "must be respected" and Vučić accused him of a "provocation".

In May 2022 during the World Economic Forum in Davos, Serbia's Aleksandar Vučić remarked "the relations between Albania, Serbia, and North Macedonia have never been better.” Serbia promoted a joint economic and political zone between the three Western Balkan states, and asserted an “open-door policy” for anyone ready to cooperate.

Minority rights 

In December 2008 Serbian police arrested ten former members of the Kosovo Liberation Army (KLA), in an Albanian-populated area bordering Kosovo. Serbia's war crimes prosecution office stated that it had evidence that the ten KLA members had killed 51 people and kidnapped 159 civilians in Kosovo between June and October 1999.

See also 

 Foreign relations of Albania
 Foreign relations of Serbia
 Albania–Kosovo relations
 Kosovo–Serbia relations
 Kosovo Serbs
 Accession of Albania to the European Union
 Accession of Serbia to the European Union
 Albania–Yugoslavia relations
 Albania in the Eurovision Song Contest 2008

References

External links 

 
 
 
 
 
 
 
 
 
 Prof. dr. Zef Mirdita, ALBANIA IN THE LIGHT OF SERBIAN FOREIGN POLICY
Report of the International Commission to Inquire into the Causes and Conduct of the Balkan War (1914)

 
Serbia
Bilateral relations of Serbia